Wall Lake Township may refer to the following places in the United States:
Wall Lake Township, Sac County, Iowa
Wall Lake Township, Wright County, Iowa

Township name disambiguation pages